Mexopolis (also known as Mexopolis Animation Studio) is an American-Mexican production company founded in 1994 by Jorge R. Gutierrez and Sandra Equihua. It produced the television series El Tigre: The Adventures of Manny Rivera, the film The Book of Life and most recently the limited series Maya and the Three. The company is currently located in Studio City, California.

Works
2002: El Tigre: Manny Rivera (pilot)
2004: Pepe the Bull (cancelled)
2007–2008: El Tigre: The Adventures of Manny Rivera
2010: Carmen Got Expelled (cancelled)
2010–2013: Mad (various skits)
2012: Super Macho Fighter (cancelled)
2014: The Book of Life
2020: We the People / Immigration (music video)
2021: Maya and the Three
TBA: I, Chihuahua

References

External links
Mexopolis.com

Television production companies of the United States
American animation studios